Imperial is the second album by In Fear and Faith. It was released June 15, 2010 through Rise Records and is the band's last release to feature vocalist Cody Anderson. Between late June and early August, the band performed on the 2010 Vans Warped Tour.

Background
Writing for Imperial began during the start of 2010 and its recording took place that spring. Brian McTernan was chosen as the producer for the album during its pre-stages. The group also called-in Lee Duck (of Sky Eats Airplane) for assistance with programing and electronic musicianship.

Track listing

Personnel
In Fear and Faith
 Ramin Niroomand - lead guitar, keyboards, piano
 Mehdi Niroomand - drums
 Tyler McElhaney - bass guitar, samples
 Cody "Duke" Anderson - unclean vocals
 Scott Barnes - clean vocals
 Noah Slifka - rhythm guitar

Additional musicians
Lee Duck - synths, programming, electronics
Production
Produced by Brian McTernan
Mastered by Kris Crummett

References

In Fear and Faith albums
2010 albums
Rise Records albums
Albums produced by Brian McTernan